Kathy Cox may refer to:

 Kathy Cox (American politician) 
 Kathy Cox (skydiver)

See also
 Cathy Cox (disambiguation)
 Katherine Cox (disambiguation)